Leucopogon gracillimus is a shrub in the family Ericaceae. It is native to Western Australia.

Description
Leucopogon gracillimus  is an erect slender shrub, growing to heights of from 0.2 m to 1.5 m high. Its white flowers are seen from May to September.

Distribution and habitat
It is found in the IBRA Regions of: Geraldton Sandplains, Jarrah Forest,  and the Swan Coastal Plain, growing
on sandy and gravelly soils, on plains, low ridges, seasonally wet flats, and outcrops.

Taxonomy
It was first described in 1839 by Augustin Pyramus de Candolle. The specific epithet, gracillimus, derives from the Latin adjective, gracilis ("slender")  and describes the plant as being very slender.

References

gracillimus
Ericales of Australia

Eudicots of Western Australia
Plants described in 1839